Lucas Ferreira Cardoso (born 7 April 1994) is a Brazilian footballer who currently plays as a forward for Football Superleague of Kosovo club Ballkani.

Career statistics

Club

Notes

References

1994 births
Living people
Brazilian footballers
Brazilian expatriate footballers
Association football forwards
Clube Recreativo e Atlético Catalano players
Itumbiara Esporte Clube players
Atlético Clube Goianiense players
Rio Branco Football Club players
FK Pelister players
FK Partizani Tirana players
FC Drita players
Macedonian First Football League players
Kategoria e Parë players
Expatriate footballers in Albania
Expatriate footballers in Kosovo
Brazilian expatriate sportspeople in Albania
Brazilian expatriate sportspeople in Kosovo